Lyubov Smolka (née Ruchkova; ; born 29 November 1952) is a Ukrainian former track and field athlete who competed in the 1500 metres for the Soviet Union.

Born in Pavlohrad, Ukrainian SSR, she had her breakthrough performance in Moscow in 1980, taking second place in the 1500 m to Tatyana Kazankina, who broke the world record. Smolka was two seconds behind with 3:56.7 minutes, though this was enough to make her the second fastest woman ever at that point. Her time, as of 2016, still ranks her within the all-time top thirty athletes for the event.

Smolka ranked third at the Soviet Athletics Championships and was chosen for the 1980 Moscow Olympics as a result. She reached the final at the Moscow Games and placed sixth in the 1500 metres final. That year she also set a best in the 3000 metres with 8:36.0 minutes. Her sole international medal came at the 1981 European Athletics Indoor Championships, where she was bronze medallist in the 1500 m, behind Italy's Agnese Possamai and fellow Soviet Valentina Ilyinykh.

Later in her career, she was fourth in the 3000 m at the 1984 Soviet Championships and runner-up at the 1985 Soviet Championships, but never again competed at a major international championship.

International competitions

References

External links

Living people
1952 births
People from Pavlohrad
Soviet female middle-distance runners
Ukrainian female middle-distance runners
Olympic athletes of the Soviet Union
Athletes (track and field) at the 1980 Summer Olympics
Sportspeople from Dnipropetrovsk Oblast